David Franklin Alexander (born July 28, 1964) is a high school football coach and a former professional American football center and guard.  He played ten seasons in the National Football League (NFL) for the Philadelphia Eagles and the New York Jets. He played college football at the University of Tulsa and was drafted in the fifth round of the 1987 NFL Draft.

After his professional career, Alexander operated a business as a custom homebuilder, while also pursuing a career in coaching.  He worked as an assistant coach for seven years at Jenks High School in Jenks, Oklahoma. In 2005-06, he was also head coach of the Tulsa Talons of the af2 arena football league. In 2013, he left Jenks to move to neighboring Broken Arrow High School, where he had played and graduated in 1982, as the running backs coach.  In January 2014 he was announced as Broken Arrow's new head football coach. Although Broken Arrow won a state championship in 2018 under Alexander's leadership, it fired Alexander after the 2020 season.

References

1964 births
Living people
American football offensive linemen
Philadelphia Eagles players
New York Jets players
Tulsa Golden Hurricane football players
People from Silver Spring, Maryland
Ed Block Courage Award recipients